Phillip Paul LaRue (born October 9, 1981) is an American singer, songwriter, artist and producer from Nashville, Tennessee. He has released four studio albums with his band LaRue, formed by his sister Natalie LaRue and himself, and two studio albums as solo artist. He has sold over 500,000 copies and worked with many well-known music artists, including Tenth Avenue North, Brandon Heath, Jars of Clay, Audrey Assad, Jennifer Knapp, Phil Wickham, Ronnie Dunn, Jason Castro and Dave Barnes. In 2010, he won a Dove Award for Song of the Year for co-writing "By Your Side" for Tenth Avenue North. He also received a billboard #1 for the writing the song Whiskey in My Water

His music is frequently featured in television, films & adds including but not excluding Ghost Whisperer (CBS), One Tree Hill (CW), Harper's Island (CBS), The Hills (MTV), and Nashville (ABC), Apple, Volkswagen, Ford.  He is also in a band called "The Rival" http://www.therivalmusic.com which has had many placements for TV/FILM.

Early life
Phillip Paul LaRue was born on October 9, 1981, in Butte County, California, the son of Paul William LaRue and Carolynn Marie LaRue (née, Nesbitt), who were married on October 11, 1980 in Santa Barbara County, California. His younger sister is Natalie LaRue, and he has two additional younger twin sisters.

Discography

As LaRue

As Solo artist

References

External links
 CMI Academy

1981 births
Living people
American male singer-songwriters
Performers of contemporary Christian music
American performers of Christian music
People from Nashville, Tennessee
Singer-songwriters from Tennessee
21st-century American singers
21st-century American male singers